Deh Mir or Deh-e Mir or Deh-i-Mir may refer to:
 Deh-e Mir, Rudbar-e Jonubi, Kerman Province
 Deh-e Mir, Sirjan, Kerman Province
 Deh Mir, Bampur, Sistan and Baluchestan Province
 Deh-e Mir, Dalgan, Sistan and Baluchestan Province
 Deh Mir, Khusf, South Khorasan Province
 Deh-e Mir, Qaen, South Khorasan Province